Macclesfield was a galley or "frigate" that the British East India Company (EIC) hired in 1699. She made two voyages for the EIC, the first to China (Canton), and the second to Bombay. 

1st EIC voyage (1699–1701): Captain John Hurle sailed from the  Downs on 2 March 1699, bound for China. Macclesfield was at Madeira on 14 March, reached Batavia on 15 July, and arrived at Macao on 26 August. She was at Whampoa Anchorage on 15 September, back at Macao on 29 September, and again at Whampoa on 7 October. She left Whampoa on 18 July 1700, and arrived at Chusan on 6 August. She left Chusan on 24 December and arrived at Portsmouth on 1 July 1701.

In March 1801, on her voyage from China back to Portsmouth, Macclesfield may have passed through the Gaspar Strait. She apparently passed by the Macclesfield Bank.

2nd EIC voyage (1701-1703): Captain Thomas Roberts or Captain Hurle sailed from the Downs on 10 September 1701, bound for Bombay. Macclesfield was at Madeira on 29 October and Sâo Tiago on 20 October. From there she stopped at Annabon (probably Annobón, and St Helena. She arrived at Bombay on 29 March 1702. from there she visited Surat, Muscat, and Mokha, before reaching the Cape of Good Hope in December. She then sailed to the Downs.

It is not clear what happened to Macclesfield after her two voyages for the EIC. There are references that suggest that she may have become a country ship sailing out of India.

Notes, citations, and references
Notes

Citations

References
 
 
 

1799 ships
Age of Sail merchant ships of England
Ships of the British East India Company